SCUM Manifesto is a radical feminist manifesto by Valerie Solanas, published in 1967. It argues that men have ruined the world, and that it is up to women to fix it. To achieve this goal, it suggests the formation of SCUM, an organization dedicated to overthrowing society and eliminating the male sex. The Manifesto has been described as a satire or parody, especially due to its parallels with Freud's theory of femininity, though this is disputed, even by Solanas herself.

The term "SCUM" appeared on the cover of the first edition from Olympia Press as "S.C.U.M." and was said to stand for "Society for Cutting Up Men". Solanas objected, insisting that it was not an acronym, although the expanded term appeared in a Village Voice ad she had written in 1967.

The Manifesto was little-known until Solanas attempted to murder Andy Warhol in 1968. This event brought significant public attention to the Manifesto and Solanas herself. While feminist Ti-Grace Atkinson defended Solanas and considered the Manifesto a valid criticism of patriarchy, others, such as Betty Friedan, considered Solanas' views to be too radical and polarizing.

Publication history 
Solanas wrote SCUM Manifesto between 1965 and 1967. In 1967, she self-published the first edition by making two thousand mimeographed copies and selling them on the streets of Greenwich Village in New York City. Solanas charged women one dollar and men two dollars each. By the following spring, about 400 copies had been sold. Solanas signed a publishing contract with Maurice Girodias in August 1967 for a novel and asked him to accept the SCUM Manifesto in its place later that year.

The first commercial edition of the Manifesto was published by Olympia Press in New York in 1968. It includes a preface by Maurice Girodias and an essay titled "Wonder Waif Meets Super Neuter" by Paul Krassner. According to Jansen, there are subtle differences between the 1968 Olympia Press edition and Solanas' original mimeographed version. In an interview with The Village Voice, Solanas commented on the Olympia Press edition, complaining that "none of the corrections ... [she] wanted made were included and that many other changes in wording were made—all for the worse—and that there were many 'typographical errors': words and even extended parts of sentences left out, rendering the passages they should've been in incoherent." In 1977, Solanas self-published a "correct" edition which was closer to the original version and included an introduction written by her.

The SCUM Manifesto has been reprinted at least 10 times in English and translated into Croatian, Czech, Finnish, French, German, Hebrew, Italian, Spanish, Swedish, Turkish, Portuguese, Dutch, and Danish. It has also been excerpted in several feminist anthologies, including Sisterhood Is Powerful: An Anthology of Writings from the Women's Liberation Movement (1970), a collection of radical feminist writing edited by Robin Morgan. Verso Books published an edition in 2004 with an introduction by feminist philosopher Avital Ronell. Jon Purkis and James Bowen describe the SCUM Manifesto as a "pamphlet which has become one of the longest surviving perennials of anarchist publishing".

Solanas' sister, Judith A. Solanas Martinez, is the reported copyright holder of the SCUM Manifesto by 1997 renewal.

Contents 
The Manifesto opens with the following declaration:

Solanas begins by presenting a theory of the male as an "incomplete female" who is genetically deficient due to the Y chromosome. According to Solanas, this genetic deficiency causes the male to be emotionally limited, egocentric, and incapable of mental passion or genuine interaction. She describes the male as lacking empathy and unable to relate to anything apart from his own physical sensations. 

The Manifesto continues by arguing that the male spends his life attempting to become female, and thereby overcome his inferiority. He does this by "constantly seeking out, fraternizing with and trying to live through and fuse with the female." Solanas rejects Freud's theory of penis envy, and argues that men have "pussy envy". Solanas then accuses men of turning the world into a "shitpile" and presents a long list of grievances.

The bulk of the Manifesto consists of a list of critiques of the male sex. They are divided into the following sections:
 War
 Niceness, Politeness and "Dignity"
 Money, Marriage and Prostitution, Work and Prevention of an Automated Society
 Fatherhood and Mental Illness (fear, cowardice, timidity, humility, insecurity, passivity)
 Suppression of Individuality, Animalism (domesticity and motherhood) and Functionalism
 Prevention of Privacy
 Isolation, Suburbs and Prevention of Community
 Conformity
 Authority and Government
 Philosophy, Religion and Morality Based on Sex
 Prejudice (racial, ethnic, religious, etc.)
 Competition, Prestige, Status, Formal Education, Ignorance and Social and Economic Classes
 Prevention of Conversation
 Prevention of Friendship and Love
 "Great Art" and "Culture"
 Sexuality
 Boredom
 Secrecy, Censorship, Suppression of Knowledge and Ideas, and Exposés
 Distrust
 Ugliness
 Hate and Violence
 Disease and Death

Due to the aforementioned grievances, the Manifesto concludes that the elimination of the male sex is a moral imperative. It argues that women must replace the "money-work system" with a system of complete automation, as this will lead to the collapse of the government and the loss of men's power over women.

In order to accomplish these goals, the Manifesto proposes that a revolutionary vanguard of women be formed. This vanguard is referred to as SCUM. The Manifesto argues that SCUM should employ sabotage and direct action tactics rather than civil disobedience, as civil disobedience is only useful for making small changes to society. In order to destroy the system, violent action is necessary: "If SCUM ever marches, it will be over the President's stupid, sickening face; if SCUM ever strikes, it will be in the dark with a six-inch blade."

The Manifesto ends by describing a female-dominated utopian future with, eventually, no men. There would be no money, and disease and death would have been eliminated. It argues that men are irrational to defend the current system and should accept the necessity of their destruction.

Reception and criticism 
Various critics, scholars, and journalists have analyzed the Manifesto and Solanas' statements regarding it. Prof. James Martin Harding said she  a "radical program". Prof. Dana Heller said the author had an "anarchic social vision" and the Manifesto had "near-utopian theories" and a "utopian vision of a world in which mechanization and systems of mass (re)production would render work, sexual intercourse, and the money system obsolete." 

According to Village Voice reviewer B. Ruby Rich, "SCUM was an uncompromising global vision" that criticized men for many faults including war and not curing disease; many but not all points were "quite accurate"; some kinds of women were also criticized, subject to women's changing when men are not around; and sex (as in sexuality) was criticized as "exploitative". According to Janet Lyon, the Manifesto "pitt[ed] ... 'liberated' women ... against 'brainwashed' women".

Feminist critic Germaine Greer said that Solanas argued that both genders were separated from their humanity and that men want to be like women. Alice Echols says the Manifesto articulates gender as absolute rather than relative.

Heller argued that the Manifesto shows women's separation from basic economic and cultural resources and, because of psychological subordination to men, women's perpetuation of that separation. Robert Marmorstein of the Voice said that SCUM's main message included that "men have fouled up the world" and "are no longer necessary (even biologically)". Jansen said Solanas considered men "biological[ly] inferior". According to Laura Winkiel, the Manifesto wants heterosexual capitalism overthrown and the means of production taken over by women. Rich and Jansen said that technology and science would be welcome in the future.

Jansen describes the plan for creating a women's world as mainly nonviolent, as based on women's nonparticipation in the current economy and having nothing to do with any men, thereby overwhelming police and military forces. If solidarity among women was insufficient, some women could take jobs and "unwork", causing systemic collapse; and describes the plan as anticipating that by eliminating money, there'd be no further need to kill men. Jansen and Winkiel say that Solanas imagined a women-only world. 

Daily News reporters Frank Faso and Henry Lee, two days after Solanas shot Warhol, said Solanas "crusades for a one-sex world free of men". Winkiel says the Manifesto imagines a violent revolutionary coup by women. Prof. Ginette Castro found the Manifesto was "the feminist charter on violence", supporting terrorist hysteria. According to Jansen, Solanas posited men as animals who will be stalked and killed as prey, the killers using weapons as "phallic symbols turned against men". 

Rich, Castro, reviewer Claire Dederer, Friedan, Prof. Debra Diane Davis, Deborah Siegel, Winkiel, Marmorstein, and Greer said that Solanas' plan was largely to eliminate men, including by men murdering each other. Rich thought it might be Swiftian satire and that men's retraining was an alternative in the Manifesto. Castro did not take the elimination of men as serious, and Marmorstein included criminal sabotage of men.

According to Jansen, it called for reproduction only of females, and not even of females once the problems of aging and death were solved so that a next generation would no longer be needed. According to Lyon, the Manifesto is irreverent and witty, according to Siegel the Manifesto "articulated bald female rage" and Jansen says the Manifesto is "shocking" and breathtaking. Rich described Solanas as a "one-woman scorched-earth squad" and Siegel says the stance was "extreme" and "reflected a more general disaffection with nonviolent protest in America overall." 

Rich says the Manifesto brought out women's "despair and anger" and advanced feminism. According to Winkiel, U.S. radical feminism emerged because of this "declaration of war against capitalism and patriarchy". Heller suggests the Manifesto is chiefly socialist-materialist. Echols has argued that Solanas had "unabashed misandry", and people associated with Andy Warhol (whom she shot) and various media saw it as "man-hating".

As parody and satire 
Laura Winkiel, an associate professor of English at the University of Colorado at Boulder, argues that the "SCUM manifesto parodies the performance of patriarchal social order it refuses". Winkiel further suggests that the manifesto is "an illicit performance, a mockery of the 'serious' speech acts of patriarchy". The SCUM women mock the way in which certain men run the world and legitimize their power, Winkiel contends. Similarly, sociologist Ginette Castro states: If we examine the text more closely, we see that its analysis of patriarchal reality is a parody [...] The content itself is unquestionably a parody of the Freudian theory of femininity, where the word woman is replaced by man [...] All the cliches of Freudian psychoanalytical theory are here: the biological accident, the incomplete sex, "penis envy" which has become "pussy envy," and so forth [...] Here we have a case of absurdity being used as a literary device to expose an absurdity, that is, the absurd theory which has been used to give "scientific" legitimacy to patriarchy [...] What about her proposal that men should quite simply be eliminated, as a way of clearing the dead weight of misogyny and masculinity? This is the inevitable conclusion of the feminist pamphlet, in the same way that Jonathan Swift's proposal that Irish children (as useless mouths) should be fed to the swine was the logical conclusion of his bitter satirical pamphlet protesting famine in Ireland. Neither of the two proposals is meant to be taken seriously, and each belongs to the realm of political fiction, or even science fiction, written in a desperate effort to arouse public consciousness.

Writer Chavisa Woods presents a similar opinion: "The SCUM Manifesto is a masterwork of literary protest art, which is often completely misread. Much of it is actually a point-by-point re-write of multiple of Freud's writings. It is a parody." James Penner reads the manifesto as a satirical text. He states, "Like other feminist satires, the 'SCUM Manifesto' attempts to politicize women by attacking particular masculine myths that are embedded in American popular culture." He adds, "As a work of satire, the 'SCUM Manifesto' is rhetorically effective in that it deconstructs the reader's received notions of masculinity and femininity." 

English professor Carl Singleton notes the "outrageous nature" of the manifesto and Solanas' increasing mental instability, which, he argues, led many people to trivialize the text. Singleton adds, "Others saw the document as a form of political satire in the style of Jonathan Swift's A Modest Proposal." Similarly, Jansen compared it to A Modest Proposal, describing it as having "satiric brilliance" and calling Solanas "cool and mordantly funny". The bulletin of the Project of Transnational Studies echoes the comparison to Jonathan Swift, stating, "A more common strategy is to read SCUM as an instance of political fiction or parody in the vein of Jonathan Swift." 

Writing for Spin in September 1996, Charles Aaron calls the SCUM Manifesto a "riotous, pre-feminist satire". Film director Mary Harron called the manifesto a "brilliant satire" and described its tone as "very funny". According to Rich of The Village Voice, the work possibly was "satire" and could be read as "literal or symbolic". Winkiel said, "The humor and anger of satire invites women to produce this feminist script by taking on the roles of the politically performative SCUM females." Paul Krassner, who was a personal acquaintance of Solanas, called the manifesto a "dittoed document of pathological proselytization with occasional overtones of unintentional satire".

Solanas' first publisher, Maurice Girodias, thought of it as "a joke" and described the manifesto, according to J. Hoberman, as "a Swiftian satire on the depraved behavior, genetic inferiority, and ultimate disposability of the male gender".

According to a 1968 article in the Daily News, "those who profess to know Valerie say she isn't joking ... [but] that deep down she likes men." In 1968, speaking to Marmorstein, she characterized herself on the SCUM thing as dead serious. Alexandra DeMonte, however, argues that Solanas "later claimed that her manifesto was simply a satire".

SCUM organization 
Solanas organized "a public forum on SCUM" at which about 40 people, mostly men she characterized as "creeps" and "masochists", showed up. SCUM had no members besides her. According to Greer, "little evidence [existed] that S.C.U.M. ever functioned" other than as Solanas.

In a 1977 interview for The Village Voice, Solanas stated that SCUM was "just a literary device. There's no organization called SCUM—there never was, and there never will be." Solanas said that she "thought of it as a state of mind .... [in that] women who think a certain way are in SCUM .... [and] [m]en who think a certain way are in the men's auxiliary of SCUM."

SCUM as acronym 
The phrase "Society for Cutting Up Men" is on the cover of the 1967 self-published edition, after the title. This edition precedes all commercial editions. Additionally, in the August 10, 1967 issue of The Village Voice, a letter to the editor appears that was signed by a Valerie Solanas (of SCUM, West 23rd Street) that responds to a previous letter signed by a Ruth Herschberger (published in the August 3, 1967 issue) that asks why women do not rebel against men. Solanas' response reads: "I would like to inform her and other proud, independent, females like her of the existence of SCUM (Society for Cutting Up Men), a recently conceived organization which will be getting into high gear (and I mean high) within a few weeks.

Although "SCUM" originally stood for "Society for Cutting Up Men", this phrase actually occurs nowhere in the text. Heller argued that "there is no reliable evidence that Solanas intended SCUM to stand as an acronym for 'Society for Cutting Up Men'." Susan Ware et al. state that it was Solanas' publisher Girodias who claimed that SCUM was an acronym for "Society for Cutting Up Men", something Solanas never seems to have intended. Gary Dexter contends that Solanas called it the SCUM Manifesto without periods after the letters of SCUM. Dexter adds: "The spelling out of her coded title by Girodias was one more act of patriarchal intervention, an attempt to possess."

The word "SCUM" is used in the text in reference to a certain type of women, not to men. It refers to empowered women, "SCUM - dominant, secure, self-confident, nasty, violent, selfish, independent, proud, thrill-seeking, free-wheeling, arrogant females, who consider themselves fit to rule the universe, who have free-wheeled to the limits of this 'society' and are ready to wheel on to something far beyond what it has to offer". According to Avitel Ronell, that "SCUM" was intended as an acronym was a "belated add-on", which Solanas later rejected.

Influence 
The Manifesto, according to Lyon, is "notorious and influential" and was "one of the earliest ... [and] one of the most radical" tracts produced by "various strands of the American women's liberation movement". Lyon said that "by 1969 it had become a kind of bible" for Cell 16, in Boston. According to a 2012 article by Arthur Goldwag on the Southern Poverty Law Center Hatewatch blog, "Solanas continues to be much-read and quoted in some feminist circles." Whether the Manifesto should be considered a feminist classic is challenged by Heller because the Manifesto rejected a hierarchy of greatness, but she said it "remains an influential feminist text."

Women and shooting 
Laura Winkiel argues that Solanas' shooting of Andy Warhol and Mario Amaya was directly tied to the Manifesto. After shooting Warhol, Solanas told a reporter, "Read my manifesto and it will tell you what I am." Heller, however, states that Solanas "intended no connection between the manifesto and the shooting". Harding suggests that "there is no clear indication in Solanas' ambiguous statement to reporters that the contents of the manifesto would explain the specifics of her actions, at least not in the sense of providing a script for them." Harding views the SCUM Manifesto as an "extension, not the source, of performative acts, even a violent one act like the shooting of Warhol."

Winkiel argues that revolutionary Roxanne Dunbar moved to the U.S. "convinced that a women's revolution had begun", forming Cell 16 with a program based on the Manifesto. According to Winkiel, although Solanas was "outraged" at the women's movement's "appropriat[ion]" of the Manifesto, "the shooting [of Warhol] represented the feminist movement's righteous rage against patriarchy". 

Dunbar and Ti-Grace Atkinson considered the Manifesto as having initiated a "revolutionary movement". Atkinson (according to Rich) called Solanas the "'first outstanding champion of women's rights'" and probably (according to Greer) having been "radicalized" by the language of the Manifesto to leave the National Organization for Women (NOW), and (according to Winkiel) women organized in support of Solanas. 

Solanas was viewed as too mentally ill and too bound up with Warhol, according to Greer, "for her message to come across unperverted." According to Prof. Davis, the Manifesto was a "forerunner" as a "call to arms among pragmatic American feminists" and was "enjoy[ing] ... wide contemporary appeal". According to Winkiel, the Manifesto "was ... influential in the spread of 'womansculture' and lesbian separatism" and is also "credited with beginning the antipornography movement." Friedan opposed the Manifesto as bad for the feminist movement and NOW.

Film 
Scum Manifesto was adapted into a 1976 short film directed by Carole Roussopoulos and Delphine Seyrig. In the film, Seyrig reads several passages from a French translation of Solanas's manifesto.

Warhol later satirized the whole event in a subsequent movie, Women in Revolt, calling a group similar to Solanas's S.C.U.M., "P.I.G." (Politically Involved Girlies).

Solanas's creative work and relationship with Warhol is depicted in the 1996 film, I Shot Andy Warhol, a significant portion of which relates to the SCUM Manifesto, and Solanas's disputes on notions of authorship with Warhol.

Television 
"Viva Los Muertos!", an episode of the animated comedy TV series The Venture Bros., features a character named Val who directly quotes the SCUM Manifesto throughout the episode.

The SCUM manifesto was presented as a plot device in the FX television series American Horror Story: Cult, first seen in the episode "Valerie Solanas Died for Your Sins: Scumbag", which first aired on October 17, 2017. A fictionalized version of Valerie Solanas, played by the actress Lena Dunham, recited the manifesto throughout the episode.

Literature 
The title story of the Michael Blumlein short story collection, The Brains of Rats, employs the Manifesto to illustrate the male protagonist's hatred of himself and his gender.

In 2006, Swedish author Sara Stridsberg published a semi-fictional biography of Valerie Solanas, Drömfakulteten (The Dream Faculty), in which the Manifesto is referred to on several occasions. Parts of the Manifesto are also cited in the book.

Nick Cave said that Solanas in the Manifesto "talks at length about what she considers maleness and the male psyche ... basically men being halfway between humans and apes, these kind of lumbering lumps of meat, predatory lumps of meat", and that "it's quite wonderful to read .... [and]  was an aspect of that I felt rang true." Cave wrote a novel, The Death of Bunny Munro, for which he "invented a character that was Valerie Solanas's male incarnate."

Music 
Solanas is quoted in the sleeve notes of the Manic Street Preachers debut album Generation Terrorists.  Solanas directly inspired the Manic Street Preachers song "Of Walking Abortion" from their third album The Holy Bible, with the song title being taken from Solanas' work. Liverpool punk band Big in Japan composed the song "Society for Cutting Up Men" directly inspired by the manifesto. 

The Italian progressive rock band Area - International POPular Group devoted a song to Solanas' manifesto, called SCUM, which appears in their fifth album Maledetti (Maudits). The British band S.C.U.M. was named after the manifesto. On Matmos' 2006 album The Rose Has Teeth in the Mouth of a Beast, one of the tracks is "Tract for Valerie Solanas", which features excerpts of the SCUM Manifesto. British alternative band Young Knives released a song called "Society for Cutting Up Men" in December 2017.

See also 
 Feminist science fiction
 Radical feminism
 Reverse sexism
 Separatist feminism
 Critique of work

Explanatory notes

References

Citations

General and cited bibliography 

  (translated from Radioscopie du féminisme américain (Paris, France: Presses de la Fondation Nationale des Sciences Politiques, 1984)
 
 
 
 
 
 
 
 
 
 
 
 
 
 
 
 
 
 
 
  (review of Valerie Solanas' SCUM Manifesto)

External links 

 

1967 non-fiction books
AK Press books
Anarcha-feminism
Misandry
Non-fiction books adapted into films
Literature critical of work and the work ethic
Parodies
Political manifestos
Radical feminist books
Satirical works
Second-wave feminism
Self-published books